Neaera (Ancient Greek: Νέαιρα), also Neaira, is the name of multiple female characters in Greek mythology:

 Neaera, one of the 3,000 Oceanids, water-nymph daughters of the Titans Oceanus and his sister-wife Tethys.
Neaera or Neera, a Nereid and possible mother of Absyrtus by King Aeetes of Colchis.
Neaera, a lover of Xanthus (Scamander).
Neaera, a nymph who became the mother of Aegle by Zeus.
Neaera, a nymph of Thrinacia, mother of Lampetia and Phaethusa by Helios.
 Neaera, a nymph of Mount Sipylus in Lydia, mother of Dresaeus by Theiodamas.
 Neaera, mother of Evadne by Strymon.
 Neaera, a daughter of Pereus, mother of Auge, Cepheus, and Lycurgus by Aleus. In another version, she married Autolycus.
 Neaera, a daughter of Autolycus, mother of Hippothous, eventually killed herself after hearing of the death of her son.
 Neaera, one of the Niobids.
 Neaera of Lemnos, a friend of Eurynome in whose guise Pheme came to warn Eurynome of her husband's infidelity.
 Neaera, possibly the mother of Triptolemus by Celeus.

Notes

References 

 Apollodorus, The Library with an English Translation by Sir James George Frazer, F.B.A., F.R.S. in 2 Volumes, Cambridge, MA, Harvard University Press; London, William Heinemann Ltd. 1921. ISBN 0-674-99135-4. Online version at the Perseus Digital Library. Greek text available from the same website.
Gaius Julius Hyginus, Fabulae from The Myths of Hyginus translated and edited by Mary Grant. University of Kansas Publications in Humanistic Studies. Online version at the Topos Text Project.
 Gaius Valerius Flaccus, Argonautica translated by Mozley, J H. Loeb Classical Library Volume 286. Cambridge, MA, Harvard University Press; London, William Heinemann Ltd. 1928. Online version at theio.com.
 Gaius Valerius Flaccus, Argonauticon. Otto Kramer. Leipzig. Teubner. 1913. Latin text available at the Perseus Digital Library.
 Homer, The Odyssey with an English Translation by A.T. Murray, PH.D. in two volumes. Cambridge, MA., Harvard University Press; London, William Heinemann, Ltd. 1919. Online version at the Perseus Digital Library. Greek text available from the same website.
 Pausanias, Description of Greece with an English Translation by W.H.S. Jones, Litt.D., and H.A. Ormerod, M.A., in 4 Volumes. Cambridge, MA, Harvard University Press; London, William Heinemann Ltd. 1918. . Online version at the Perseus Digital Library
Pausanias, Graeciae Descriptio. 3 vols. Leipzig, Teubner. 1903.  Greek text available at the Perseus Digital Library.
 Publius Ovidius Naso, Amores edited by Christopher Marlowe, Ed. Online version at the Perseus Digital Library.
 Publius Ovidius Naso, Amores, Epistulae, Medicamina faciei femineae, Ars amatoria, Remedia amoris. R. Ehwald. edidit ex Rudolphi Merkelii recognitione. Leipzig. B. G. Teubner. 1907. Latin text available at the Perseus Digital Library.
 Quintus Smyrnaeus, The Fall of Troy translated by Way. A. S. Loeb Classical Library Volume 19. London: William Heinemann, 1913. Online version at theio.com
 Quintus Smyrnaeus, The Fall of Troy. Arthur S. Way. London: William Heinemann; New York: G.P. Putnam's Sons. 1913. Greek text available at the Perseus Digital Library.

Nereids
Oceanids
Phocian characters in Greek mythology
Suicides in Greek mythology
Divine women of Zeus